Anne Charleston (born 30 December 1942) is an Australian actress, notable for her career locally and in the United Kingdom in theatre and television. Charleston started her career in theatre in the mid 1950's, and has been a staple of the small screen since the early 1960s, starting with roles in telemovies, before making appearance in the various Crawford Productions series starting from the latter 1960s and 1970s and had several roles in series Prisoner

Charleston's best known regulars role's, however, where in the soap opera Neighbours in several stints as matriarch Madge Bishop and in the British soap Emmerdale as Lily Butterfield.

Career

Telvision
Anne Charleston first became widely recognisable in Australia starting from the late 1960s on television, taking various guest roles in the Crawford Productions police dramas including Homicide, Division 4 and Matlock Police. Other appearances included guest roles in other Crawford's adventure series Hunter (1967) and Ryan (1973), and in Network Ten-produced police drama The Long Arm (1971).

She had continuing roles in soap operas Bellbird and Class of '75, and appeared in Number 96 as a deranged woman who kidnapped Alf and Lucy's baby in late 1975. She had also appeared in the feature film version of Bellbird, Country Town (1971), playing a different character from that which she had played in the series.

In the late 1970s and the 1980s she had several small roles in soap opera Prisoner. Having briefly played the brusque daughter of released prisoner "Mum" Brooks (played by Mary Ward) in 1979, Charleston returned for several appearances in the serial as policewomen through the early 1980s before taking the larger recurring role of Deidre Kean, mother of prison toughie Reb Kean (Janet Andrewartha), in 1984. The role was intended to be a long term character in Prisoner, however, in 1985, Grundy cast her in a leading regular role in new soap opera, Possession; however, the series was cancelled by the network later that same year due to lower than desired ratings.

Charleston had also enjoyed a busy career acting in the Australian theatre. With St. Martin's Theatre she acted in Wrong Side of the Park, The Irregular Verb, To Love, Angels in Love, A Far Country, The Anniversary, Invitation to a March, Eden House, The Cavern, Have you Any Dirty Washing Mother Dear, Blithe Spirit and Children's Day.

She also appeared in J C Williamson's Woman in a Dressing Gown starring Googie Withers, Juggler's Three for the Melbourne Theatre Company Workshop, and The Secretary Bird starring Patrick Macnee. Other theatre includes Busybody, Port Wine, Night of the Ding Dong, Burst of Summer, Murder in the Cathedral, The Rivals, The Tower, Everyman, Antigone, The Man of Destiny, Otherwise Engaged and The Shifting Heart.

Neighbours
In 1986, Charleston was cast as Madge Bishop (Mitchell) in the Australian soap opera Neighbours. Madge was a new character added to the series when it switched to Network Ten. The series became popular in Australia and the United Kingdom in the years following. Through the series Charleston became internationally recognised, and won a Penguin Award in 1987 for Best Actress.

In 1992, Charleston left the series and emigrated to the Republic of Ireland. Four years later she accepted the offer to return to Neighbours, reprising the role from 1996. In her second stint in the series, Charleston observed that Madge had been transformed from being bold and fiery to a more meek and passive character, a change that led to her ultimate decision to leave the series in 2000. Her final episode was broadcast in Australia during April 2001. She returned to Neighbours in 2015 alongside co-star Ian Smith to commemorate the 30th anniversary of the serial. Charleston also appeared in a documentary celebrating the anniversary titled Neighbours 30th: The Stars Reunite, which aired in Australia and the UK in March 2015.

Following the news of Neighbours cancellation, Charleston reprised her role of Madge, imagined by Susan Kennedy as to how she might look if still alive, in the show's final ever episode, which aired on 28 July 2022.

After Neighbours

In 1989, Charleston took on the role of another 'Madge', Madge Allsop in an episode of The Dame Edna Experience on ITV in the UK, when Dame Edna Everage asked Doctor Christiaan Barnard to give her bridesmaid a face lift. Dame Edna did not like Madge's new face, so asked the surgeon to reverse the operation, restoring Emily Perry to the role.

In 2013, Charleston played a role in the Prisoner remake, Wentworth. The role saw her portraying the mother-in-law of prisoner Lizzy Birdsworth.

After leaving Neighbours for the first time, Charleston lived in Ireland for several years, and returned there after leaving the series again in 2001. With the high levels of popularity enjoyed by Neighbours in the UK, Charleston has now relaunched her career there. She has undertaken theatre and radio work in the UK and Ireland since leaving Neighbours in 2001, and is also a regular performer in pantomime. In 2001, she appeared on Lily Savage's Blankety Blank.

Charleston took the role of Dossa in comedy series Dossa and Joe, and then had the regular role of Betty Waddell in the relaunched series of Crossroads in 2003. In 2004 she was a contestant in the second series of the Living TV reality television show, I'm Famous and Frightened!

In 2005, she had cosmetic surgery performed on her neck, live on British television, on the Channel 5 programme, Cosmetic Surgery Live. In the same year, she also "regressed into a previous life", as a poor Irish farm girl, when she appeared in the programme Have I Been Here Before?.

Anne starred in Aladdin at Belfast Grand Opera House in 1995–1996 with Rod Hull and Emu.

The 2014–15 pantomime season saw Anne playing the Fairy Godmother in Cinderella at the Redditch Palace Theatre.

Emmerdale
In late 2006, Charleston joined the cast of Emmerdale, originating the character of Lily Butterfield, the estranged sister of Edna Birch (Shirley Stelfox) who arrives to attend her great niece Eve's wedding blessing. Unbeknown to Edna and Lily, Edna's son Peter has invited them both to try to get them to make amends. However, a dark family secret will ensure their reunion does not run smoothly.

Of her new role, Charleston said: "I am over the moon to be joining one of my favourite soaps. I am delighted to be playing such a fantastic character." Series Producer Kathleen Beedles added: "We are thrilled to confirm that Anne will be playing the character of Lily. Viewers can expect to see sparks fly when Edna and Lily are reunited and we are looking forward to welcoming Anne on-set." Charleson's first taping day was on Monday 25 September 2006, and she first appeared on screen on Friday 3 November 2006.  She appeared in only three episodes. The character returned in October 2007 for a four-month run, and returned again in 2008 on a regular contract. Charleston quit in April 2009 and the character was subsequently written out of the serial and made her last appearance on 3 August 2009.

Theatre
Charleston has appeared in theatre roles both locally and internationally in her native Australia; her theatre credits go back to the mid-1950s 
 
In January 2010, it was announced that Charleston would be joining the touring production of Calendar Girls as Jessie (Miss January).
 
In July 2012, it was revealed that Charleston would appear alongside Mischa Barton in an Irish stage production of Steel Magnolias, playing Ouiser Boudreaux in the production. It was due to premiere at the Gaiety Theatre, Dublin in September, and be followed by a nationwide tour.Mischa Barton live on Moncrieff tomorrow Newstalk. 11 July 2012 

In August 2012, Charleston was a contestant on BBC TV's Celebrity Masterchef.

In 2012, Charleston toured the UK in a production of The Cemetery Club alongside Anita Harris, Shirley Anne Field and Peter Ellis.

FilmographyFilmTelevision'

References

External links
 

Actresses from Melbourne
Australian expatriates in Ireland
Australian expatriates in England
Australian film actresses
Australian soap opera actresses
Australian stage actresses
1942 births
Living people
20th-century Australian actresses
21st-century Australian actresses